"Borderline" is a song by American singer Madonna from her debut studio album Madonna (1983). Written and produced by Reggie Lucas, the song was remixed by John "Jellybean" Benitez. It was released by Sire Records as the fifth and final single from the album on February 15, 1984. The song is also included on Madonna's greatest hits albums The Immaculate Collection (1990) and Celebration (2009).

Lyrically, the track talks about unrequited love and finds the singer using refined and expressive vocals. The song received critical acclaim; contemporary critics and authors called it the most harmonically complex track from Madonna, and lauded the singer's vocals. In the United States, "Borderline" became Madonna's first top-ten hit on the Billboard Hot 100, peaking at number ten in June 1984. Billboard ranked the song No. 35 for 1984. In the United Kingdom, it peaked at number two after it was re-released as a single in 1986. The song reached the top 10 or 20 in numerous European nations and topped the singles chart of Ireland.

The "Borderline" music video portrayed Madonna as the girlfriend of a Hispanic man, to whom she returns after being enticed to pose and model for a white photographer. It generated academic interest for its use of power as symbolism. According to some critics, the video helped establish Madonna's early success, and she was credited for resisting the taboo of interracial relationships within it.

"Borderline" was placed at No. 2 on Rolling Stones list of the 100 Best Singles of 1984. Pitchfork ranked it among the 200 best songs from the 1980s. Madonna performed it on two of her concert tours: Virgin (1985) and Sticky & Sweet (2008). The song has been covered by artists such as Duffy, Jody Watley, Counting Crows, and The Flaming Lips.

Background and composition 

Madonna had already composed three songs when Warner Brothers contacted producer Reggie Lucas about working on her debut album. Madonna and Lucas had a meeting at the loft apartment of her then-boyfriend, artist Jean-Michel Basquiat, and he brought two of his own compositions, "Borderline" and "Physical Attraction."

After recording "Borderline" in February 1983, Madonna was unhappy with the final version, feeling that Lucas used too many instruments and did not consider her ideas. This led to a dispute between the two and, after finishing the album, Lucas left the project without altering the songs to Madonna's specifications. The singer asked Funhouse DJ John "Jellybean" Benitez to remix "Borderline" and two of the other recorded tracks. Upon hearing the final version, Seymour Stein, head of Sire Records, declared, "I dared to believe this was going to be huge beyond belief, the biggest thing I'd ever had, after I heard 'Borderline'... The passion that she put into that song, I thought, there's no stopping this girl".

"Borderline" presented a change in Madonna's normal vocal tone. A sentimental track, the song talks about a love that is never quite fulfilled; according to Santiago Fouz-Hernández, one of the authors of Madonna's Drowned Worlds, lyrics such as Something in way you love me won't let me be/I don't want to be your prisoner so baby won't you set me free depicted a rebellion against male chauvinism. Madonna used a refined and expressive singing voice, backed by Lucas's instrumentations. The song is considered to be the best example of the working relationship between Lucas and Madonna, as Lucas pushed the singer to find emotional depth in the song. Although sounding icy, the chorus is contemporary in style, and the song's vocal range was later used by Madonna as her own personal range through her whole music career. It opens with a keyboard-rich intro played on a Fender-Rhodes electric piano and a catchy synth melody provided by Fred Zarr. Bass player Anthony Jackson doubled Dean Gant's synth bass to provide a solid and more complex texture.

The chords were inspired by the 1970s disco sound in Philadelphia, as well as Elton John's musical style; the chord sequences evoke Bachman-Turner Overdrive's song "You Ain't Seen Nothing Yet", while the synth phases display Madonna's typical musical style. The song is set in common time with a moderate tempo of 120 beats per minute and composed in the key of D major with Madonna's vocal range spanning from F3 to B4. "Borderline" follows in the chord progression of D–C–G in the first verse to Bm–Em–A–F in the pre-chorus, and changes to A–F–Bm–A–E and G–D–A in the chorus.

Critical reception 

Upon release, "Borderline" was acclaimed by music critics. Author J. Randy Taraborrelli, in his biography of Madonna, said it was, alongside "Holiday", one of the "key recordings" that helped to establish the singer in the music industry; he also added that her "sober" vocals made the track "as close to an old Motown production as a hit could get in the dance-music-driven eighties".  Author Maury Dean, in his book Rock 'n' Roll Gold Rush, called the song "echoey boogie" with "saucy-style and come-hither magnetism". On The Complete Guide to the Music of Madonna, Rikky Rooksby deemed it the most "harmonically complex" track of the album. Commentator Dave Marsh, author of The Heart of Rock & Soul, said that the "music's too damn good to be denied, no matter whose value system it disrupts". Journalist Roxanne Orgill in her book Shout, Sister, Shout!, commented that "Borderline" was the song that made Madonna "the star that she is".

Bill Lamb from About.com described the song, along with "Holiday" and "Lucky Star", as "state of the art dance-pop" and praised their "irresistible" pop hooks. On a similar note, Matthew Hocter from music portal Albumism, said it was "the emergence of a woman who was beginning to master the art of the pop hook". From AllMusic, Stephen Thomas Erlewine called it one of the album's highlights and called it "effervescent"; also from AllMusic, Stewart Mason said it "proved that Madonna was more than a pretty face, a dancer's body and a squeaky voice. [...] 'Borderline' [...] is a pure treasure, one of those unabashedly commercial pop songs that also manages to at least hint at deeper emotions", concluding that the singer "delivers the best vocal performance of her early career, when her limitations were at their most obvious".

Slants Sal Cinquemani deemed it "soulful". From the same magazine, Eric Henderson praised its "tender" chords and wrote: "Has there ever been an opening refrain more winsome and instantly nostalgic than that of Madonna’s first Top 10 single?". The Orlando Sentinels Thom Duffy commented that "Borderline" was the song that "introduced Madonna, the helium-induced pop star, and siren kitten". For Pitchfork, Jillian Mapes opined that its "passionate performance takes it over the top". On his review of The Immaculate Collection (1990), Drew Mackie from People said it was "catchy" and a "promise of even better things to come" in Madonna's career. For The Quietus, Matthew Lindsay opined it was one of the singer's most "enduring" and "genuinely soulful" tracks. According to the staff from The Advocate, it's an "enjoyable earworm". The Arizona Republics Ed Masley deemed it the best song on the album as well as Madonna's second greatest single; he wrote that, although it features "the same girlish pout as her other early hits, [she] invests  with way more soul". "Borderline" also came second on Rolling Stones list of the 100 Best Singles of 1984; Carrie Grant hailed it a "melodic synth-a-palooza" with "sweetly-sung, restrained but emotional" vocals.

Pitchfork ranked the 200 best songs from the 1980s and placed "Borderline" at 106; "four minutes of emotional helium [...] there’s so much charisma, it’s easy to see why it catapulted her toward being the biggest pop star in the world", read Jeremy Gordon's review. Louis Virtel from The Backlot highlighted its "desire and unabashed innocence" and considered it Madonna's sixth best song. Gay Star News Joe Morgan opined that, even though Madonna has done "more complicated songs, [...] 'Borderline' is pure pop finery". For Matthew Jacobs from the HuffPost, it's "all about those wailing vocals", as well as the singer's 17th best single. PinkNews Mayer Nissim deemed it Madonna's 27th best song and Samuel R. Murrian from Parade her sixth; the former opined it was "deep in themes and melody" and proof that the singer was not a "one-trick disco show pony", while the latter called it "timeless". Entertainment Weeklys Chuck Arnold expressed that "[Madonna] has never sounded more genuinely soulful than on the divine Borderline'"; he picked it as the singer's 16th best single. Finally, Billboards Joe Lynch ranked it as Madonna's 19th greatest single. He wrote: "while it might’ve been a hit for anyone, it’s Madonna’s vocals – an overpowering mixture of aching naivete and teasing vitality – that push 'Borderline' into the rarefied realm of pop classics". At the 1984 Billboard Music Awards, "Borderline" received two nominations: Best New Artist for Madonna and Best Choreography in a Music Video.

Commercial reception 
"Borderline" was officially released as the Madonna album's fifth and final single on February 15, 1984. The week of March 3, several radio stations began to add it to its rotation, which caused it to enter Billboards Bubbling Under Hot 100 chart at number 103. One week later, it entered the Hot 100 at number 88, eventually peaking at number 10 on June 16, becoming Madonna's first top-ten hit; it remained on the chart for 30 weeks. On March 24, the track made its debut on the Dance Club Songs chart at number 67; it reached number four the week of May 11. "Borderline" also proved to be a crossover success by peaking at 23 on the Hot Adult Contemporary Tracks chart. On October 22, 1998, the song was certified gold by the Recording Industry Association of America (RIAA) for shipment of 500,000 copies. In Canada, the single debuted at number 56 in the RPM issue dated August 4, 1984 and peaked at 25 on September 15. The song was present on the chart for 14 weeks.

In the United Kingdom, where the song was released on June 2, 1984, it was only able to reach number 56. However, following a re-release on January 1, 1986, it peaked at number two, spending nine weeks on the charts. "Borderline" was certified gold by the British Phonographic Industry (BPI) in February 1986. According to the MTV UK, the single has sold 310,000 copies in the United Kingdom as of 2010. Across Europe, the song topped the chart in Ireland and entered the top ten in Belgium and the Netherlands. It also peaked at number 23 in Switzerland and number 12 in Australia. In New Zealand, "Borderline" peaked at number 47.

Music video

Background 
The music video for "Borderline" was filmed on location in Los Angeles, California from January 30 to February 2, 1984. It marked the first collaboration between the singer and director Mary Lambert, who would go on to direct the videos for "Like a Virgin", "Material Girl" (1985), "La Isla Bonita" (1987)  and "Like a Prayer" (1989). Lambert recalled that there was "no formula" used when making the video and that they were simply "inventing it as we went along". In the video, Madonna plays a young woman emotionally torn between her Hispanic boyfriend (Louie Louie) and a white photographer for whom she models and who publishes her pictures on a magazine cover. On the January 1997 edition of Rolling Stone, Lambert described the plot:
[A] Boy and [a] girl enjoy simple pleasures of barrio love; girl is tempted by fame, boy gets huffy, girl gets famous, but her new beau's out-of-line reaction to a behavioral trifle (all she did was to spray-paint his expensive sports car) drives her back to her true love.
The video narrative weaves the two relationship stories together in color and black-and-white. In the color sequences, Madonna sings, flirts and seduces her boyfriend, and in the black-and-white sequences she poses for the photographer. She wore lace gloves, high-heeled boots with thick socks, and her trademark "boy-toy" belt. Other clothes included crop-tops, T-shirts, vests and sweaters coupled with cut-off pants and jeans, as well as a couple of evening gowns. The video began receiving airplay on MTV the week of March 24; it was then included on Madonna's music video compilations The Immaculate Collection (1990) and Celebration: The Video Collection (2009).

Analysis and reception 

According to critics and scholars, with the video Madonna helped break the taboo of interracial relationships. Bob Batchelor and Scott Stoddart, authors of The 1980s: American Popular Culture Through History, pointed out that her relationships with the Hispanic man and the white photographer mirrored the struggle many Hispanic women faced with their partners. Douglas Kellner said that, although at first it seems that she breaks up with her Hispanic boyfriend in favor of the photographer, she later rejects the photographer; thus implying her desire to control her own sexual pleasures and to cross "established pop borderlines" with lyrics, like "You just keep on pushing my love, over the borderline". Also, the contrasting image of Madonna, first as a "messy blonde" in the street sequence and later as a glamorous high-fashion blonde, suggests that one can construct one's own image and identity; Kellner also wrote that the "street" image depicted in the video allowed her to appeal to Hispanic and black youths.

Critics also noted a symbolism of power in the two contrasting storylines; the photographer's studio is decorated with classical sculptures and nude statues holding spears, phallic symbols. In contrast, phallic symbols portrayed in the Hispanic neighborhood include a street lamp that Madonna embraces and a pool cue held erect by Madonna's boyfriend. Author Andrew Metz commented that with these scenes, the singer was displaying her "sophisticated views on the fabrications of feminity as a supreme power rather than the normal views of oppression". On one particular shot, when posing for the photographer, Madonna looks towards the camera with challenge in her eyes, depicting sexual aggression; on another, she starts spraying graffiti over statues, portraying herself as a transgressor who breaks rules and wants to innovate.

Author Carol Clerk said that the videos of "Borderline" and "Lucky Star" established the singer not as the girl next door, but as a "sassy, smart and tough funny woman"; Kellner further added that the video depicted motifs and strategies that helped Madonna in her journey to become a star.   The clothes she wore in the video were later used by designers like Karl Lagerfeld and Christian Lacroix. Matthew Lindsay compared the video's plot to the 1975 film Mahogany and the work of director John Hughes. "Borderline" is often regarded as one of Madonna's "career-making moments". Louis Virtel from The Backlot placed it in the 11th position of his ranking of the singer's videos; he wrote: "Remember simpler times when Madonna could just spray graffiti and look jilted at a pool hall, and that would be enough for a beautiful video? [...] [her] yearning is contagious — even if she is clad in chartreuse socks and yellow heels". Bill Lamb deemed it her tenth best and said it was her first video that "expressed [her] interest in taking the fledgling art form in challenging new directions". Finally, Out magazine considered it one of Madonna's "most stylish" videos and noted influence on Rihanna's "We Found Love" (2011).

Live performances 

Madonna first performed "Borderline" on The Dance Show on February 13, 1984; she was joined by her brother Christopher Ciccone and Erika Belle. It was then added to the setlist of the Virgin (1985) and Sticky & Sweet (2008) concert tours. On the first one, she appeared from behind a silhouette and sang the original version of the song, but omitted the second verse. She was decked out in a black ensemble consisting of a crop top beneath a vest with a silver cross pattée, matching fringed elbow length gloves and miniskirt, leggings, low heel leather boots and a crucifix earring in one ear. "Borderline" is one of three performances not included on the Madonna Live: The Virgin Tour video release.

On the Sticky & Sweet Tour, twenty three years later, it was performed in a rock-style version with the singer playing a purple Gibson Les Paul electric guitar. Madonna wore red gym shorts and knee-high black socks while the backdrops depicted graffiti and artwork inspired by Keith Haring. From The Denver Post, Ricardo Baca opined that the song “was gallantly transformed into an arena anthem from the 1980s”, while the New York Daily News Jim Farber compared it to the work of The Stooges. The performance was included on the Sticky & Sweet Tour live album release (2010), recorded during the four December 2008 shows in Buenos Aires, Argentina.

On March 10, 2016, Madonna sang an acoustic "Borderline" on the Melbourne concert of her Madonna: Tears of a Clown show. She was decked out as a clown, wearing a billowing yellow top and pink and white striped socks, and came onto the stage riding a tricycle. She began the performance by saying: "I don’t have bipolar disorder but I am a little borderline"; writing for The Guardian, Monica Tan praised the singer for "knowing her jokes were shit but using them as a segue into songs". Finally, on June 9, the singer did a “slowed-down, souled-up” rendition of the song on The Tonight Show Starring Jimmy Fallon back by The Roots; the number was watched by the 44th president of the United States, Barack Obama.

Covers and media appearances 

In 2000, an electro-industrial cover of the song by Nivek Ogre of OhGr was included on the tribute compilation album Virgin Voices: A Tribute To Madonna, Vol. 2; Heather Phares of AllMusic opined that this cover "missed the mark". Two years later, it was covered by Chicago pop punk band Showoff for the compilation album Punk Goes Pop.  In 2006, Jody Watley recorded a downtempo version of "Borderline" for her ninth album The Makeover. This version was released as single peaking number two on the Billboard Dance Club Songs. In 2007, a cover by The Chapin Sisters was included on the tribute album Through the Wilderness. The following year, Duffy performed "Borderline" at Radio 1's Big Weekend. The Flaming Lips and Stardeath and White Dwarfs recorded a cover of the song for the 2009 Warner Bros. Records compilation Covered, A Revolution in Sound; AllMusic's Stephen Thomas Erlewine felt this version turned the original "inside out". A "strangely country-rock" rendition of "Borderline" was performed by Counting Crows at the Royal Albert Hall; it was made available to download on MP3 through the band's website on March 17, 2009. In 2010, Cory Monteith and Lea Michele performed a mashup of "Borderline" and Madonna's 1986 single "Open Your Heart" in the episode "The Power of Madonna" of American television series Glee. It was also performed live, in 2010, by Scottish singer Steve Mason. In 2017, on the second episode of the ninth season of Will and Grace, "Who's Your Daddy?", Will Truman (played by Eric McCormack) confesses that "Borderline” got him through a bad breakup. In 2021 Kelly Clarkson sang the song during the "Kellyoke" segment on her talk show The Kelly Clarkson Show. And Welsh band Manic Street Preachers performed a cover of this song live, for the BBC 6music Festival, live in Cardiff, on 1 April 2022.

Track listings and formats 

 US 7" single
 "Borderline" (7" Remix) – 4:02
 "Think of Me" (LP Version) – 4:55

 UK 7" and limited-edition picture disc
 "Borderline" (7" Remix) – 4:02
 "Physical Attraction" (Single Edit) – 3:56

 UK 12" single
 "Borderline" (U.S Remix) – 6:57
 "Borderline" (Dub Remix) – 5:48
 "Physical Attraction" (LP Version) – 6:42

 German and UK CD Maxi-Single (1995)
 "Borderline" (LP Version) – 5:17
 "Borderline" (U.S Remix) – 6:57
 "Physical Attraction" (LP Version) – 6:42

 US 12" Maxi-Single
 "Borderline" (New Mix) – 6:54
 "Lucky Star" (New Mix) – 7:14

 US 12" promotional maxi single
 "Borderline" (New Mix) – 6:54
 "Borderline" (Instrumental) – 5:48

 Australian 12" single
 "Borderline" (U.S Remix) – 6:57
 "Borderline" (7" Remix) – 4:02
 "Borderline" (Dub Remix) – 5:48

 German 12" single
 "Borderline" (U.S Remix) – 6:57
 "Borderline" (Dub Remix) – 5:48
 "Physical Attraction" (LP version) – 6:42

 Digital single
 "Borderline" - 5:21
 "Borderline" (7" Remix) - 3:59
 "Borderline" (U.S. Remix) - 6:57

Credits and personnel 
Credits are adapted from the album and the 7-inch single liner notes.
 Madonna – lead vocals
 Reggie Lucas – writer, producer, guitars, drum programming
 Fred Zarr – synthesizers, electric and acoustic piano
 Dean Gant – synthesizers, electric and acoustic piano
 Ed Walsh – synthesizers
 Anthony Jackson – electric bass
 Ira Siegal – guitars
 Bobby Malach – tenor saxophone
 Gwen Guthrie – background vocals
 Brenda White – background vocals
 Chrissy Faith – background vocals
 Glenn Parsons - artwork
 Jeri McManus - artwork
 George Holz - photography

Charts

Weekly charts

Year-end charts

Decade-end charts

Certifications

References

Bibliography 
 
 
 
 
 
 
 
 
 
 
 
 
 
 

1984 singles
Madonna songs
Songs written by Reggie Lucas
Song recordings produced by Reggie Lucas
Sire Records singles
Warner Records singles
1983 songs
Music videos directed by Mary Lambert
The Flaming Lips songs
Irish Singles Chart number-one singles
Post-disco songs